The Phoenix Manufacturing Company, later the Phoenix Steel Company, was one of Eau Claire, Wisconsin's oldest manufacturing firms. It manufactured equipment predominantly for the sawmill and logging equipment industries, which were vital to the establishment and growth of Eau Claire.

History
The company began in 1861 when Robert Tolles and his brother-in-law, Hiram P. Graham, formed a partnership for the manufacture of sashes, doors, blinds, and general wood work. At that time, the company was located on the north bank of the Eau Claire River, west of North Dewey Street. In 1865, more partners were added for capital, and merged into the firm of Graham, White & Co., with the addition of a machinery and foundry business specializing in building and repairing sawmill machinery.

The Dewey Street location burned down in 1875, and in order to add further capital, the business was incorporated as the Phoenix Manufacturing Company (named so for its re-establishment following the fire). That same year, the company constructed a foundry and machine shop at its permanent location on the west bank of the Chippewa River, at Forest and Wisconsin streets.

In 1892, a separate division, the Phoenix Furniture Company, was organized and located near Half Moon Lake at 9th and Broadway.

Phoenix found particular success in 1903, manufacturing a steam log hauler under patent rights from Orlando Lombard. This, along with logging sleighs, snow plows and machinery for making logging roads, necessitated an expansion in 1907, adding a larger machine shop and boiler room.

As the 20th century progressed, the depletion of the timber industry took a toll on the company. While somewhat diversified in the agricultural industry, Phoenix also suffered from patent disputes, where their un-patented designs were copied and patented by competitors, leaving Phoenix subject to claims of infringement.

In 1925 the Phoenix Manufacturing Company filed for bankruptcy. That same year it was purchased by the W. H. Hobbs Supply Company, for the manufacture of steel beams, reinforcing wire, sheet metal, and ornamental steel.

In 1951, Eau Claire businessman Louis L. Phillips expanded his metal scrapyard business, buying control of Phoenix and forming it into the Phoenix Steel Corporation, which remained operational until 1976.

Products
The Phoenix Manufacturing Company produced a number of new products for the lumber milling industry. In 1887, Phoenix introduced a new band-type mill saw, known as the Esplin mill. This was followed by the Emerson bandmill, and later the Phoenix light bandmill, known for producing the "largest cut of perfect sawed lumber for the least outlay". 
The firm also furnished building parts such as arches, plates, and columns. Many structures in the Eau Claire still feature slim support columns marked with the Phoenix name. 
The company's largest success was with the Phoenix Log Hauler, a licensed version of a Lombard Steam Log Hauler. Over a hundred of these log haulers were produced. Due to greater competition from gasoline tractors, particularly the Holt tractor, Phoenix began manufacturing the Phoenix Centipede Truck for agricultural and construction use.

References

External links

Companies based in Eau Claire, Wisconsin
Historic American Engineering Record in Wisconsin